Neyrangistan, Hirbodistan, Hadokht Nask is a Zoroastrian religious book which is written in middle Persian language. The book consists of three documents whose name is gathered from them. Neyrangistan, Hirbodistan, Hadokht Nask is an exegesis text of Avesta like the Zend and refers to the laws of the Zoroastrian tradition and the opinions of exegetes regarding the laws. The texts are  probably written and collected by Saoshyant and Pishagsar, two exegetes of the Avesta. The latest available version of the book is edited in the 17th century.

References

Zoroastrian texts
Middle Persian literature
Exegesis